Mbah Surip (born Urip Achmad Ariyanto) (6 May 1957 – 4 August 2009) was an Indonesian singer. He was known for his singles "Tak Gendong" (I'll Carry) and "Bangun Tidur" (Wake up from sleep).

Biography
Mbah Surip was born Urip Achmadriyanto in May 1957 in Mojokerto, East Java.

He studied at Petra Christian University and University of Sunan Giri in Surabaya. He earned a degree in geology that led him to a career in mining and traveled to Texas, Canada and Jordan.

In 1996, he returned to Jakarta and joined several art communities, and began busking. Later, he changed his name to Surip after studying "S" philosophy. In 2003, he made his first television appearance, as an announcer on the year's AMI Awards .

He made several albums like Ijo Royo-Royo (The Green of the Green) in 1997, which was followed by another four records: Indonesia and Reformasi (Reform), both in 1998; Tak Gendong (I Carry You on My Back) in 2003 and Barang Baru (New Stuff) in 2004. His single "Tak Gendong" became a hit as ringtone. He reportedly received around Rp4.5 billion (US$450,000) for the royalties. According to Pasundan Ekspress, "Tak Gendong" was composed in 1983.

He died of a suspected heart attack, according to a team of doctors at 10.30 a.m. on 4 August 2009 on the way to Pusdikkes hospital. He was buried on Tuesday night at 11:10 p.m. in a cemetery inside poet WS Rendra's art workshop compound in Depok, West Java.

Styles
Mbah Surip had a dreadlocks hairstyle and reggae-style outfits. He was remembered for his laugh and tagline "I love you full". President Yudhoyono described him as “a down-to-earth artist who dedicated his life to develop his art in his own way”.

Personal life
Mbah Surip had four children named Tita, Varid, Risna and Ivo. Their initials formed TVRI, because he wanted to perform at TVRI.

References

Bibliography
 

1957 births
2009 deaths
Reggae musicians
20th-century Indonesian male singers
Javanese people
People from Mojokerto